Oxalis depressa  is an Oxalis species found in South Africa. It was first described in 1834.

References

External links

depressa